Doriane Vidal (born 16 April 1976) is a French snowboarder and Olympic medalist. She received a silver medal in halfpipe at the 2002 Winter Olympics in Salt Lake City.

She finished 8th in the halfpipe event at the 2006 Winter Olympics in Turin.

References

1976 births
Living people
French female snowboarders
Olympic snowboarders of France
Snowboarders at the 1998 Winter Olympics
Snowboarders at the 2002 Winter Olympics
Snowboarders at the 2006 Winter Olympics
Olympic silver medalists for France
X Games athletes
Olympic medalists in snowboarding
Medalists at the 2002 Winter Olympics
21st-century French women